"Get Ready" is the only single released from Mase's second album, Double Up. Released on May 25, 1999, it was produced by Sean "Puffy" Combs, Teddy Riley and Andreao "Fanatic" Heard", featured R&B group Blackstreet,  and contained a sample of Shalamar's 1982 single "A Night to Remember".

"Get Ready" was Mase's poorest-performing single, largely due to his retirement from music before the song's official release, meaning that he did not promote or perform the song publicly. It failed to match the success of his previous three singles, only making it to #25 on the Bubbling Under Hot 100 Singles (125 on the U.S. Charts) and #50 on the Hot R&B/Hip-Hop Singles & Tracks.

Single track listing

A-Side
"Get Ready" (Radio Mix)- 4:20  
"Get Ready" (Instrumental)- 4:12  
"Get Ready" (Acappella)- 4:22

B-Side
"Get Ready" (Radio Mix)- 4:20  
"Get Ready" (Instrumental)- 4:12  
"Get Ready" (Acappella)- 4:22

Charts

References

1999 singles
Blackstreet songs
Mase songs
Song recordings produced by Teddy Riley
Songs written by Sean Combs
Music videos directed by Hype Williams
1999 songs
Bad Boy Records singles
Songs written by Mase
Songs written by Andreao Heard